William Bradford "Bill" Keith (December 20, 1939 – October 23, 2015) was a five-string banjoist who made a significant contribution to the stylistic development of the instrument. In the 1960s he introduced a variation on the popular "Scruggs style" of banjo playing (an integral element of bluegrass music) which would soon become known as melodic style, or "Keith style".

Professional career
Keith was born in Boston, Massachusetts, United States. He attended Amherst College and graduated in 1961. In 1963 he became a member of Bill Monroe's Bluegrass Boys.

Keith's recordings and performances during these nine months with Monroe permanently altered banjo playing, and his style became an important part of the playing styles of many banjoists. After leaving the Bluegrass Boys, he joined the Jim Kweskin Jug Band playing plectrum banjo. He began playing the steel guitar and soon after 1968, worked together with Ian and Sylvia and Jonathan Edwards.

In the 1970s, Keith recorded for Rounder Records. Over the years he performed with several other musicians, such as Clarence White and David Grisman in Muleskinner, Tony Trischka, Jim Rooney and Jim Collier. Today, Keith style is still regarded as modern or progressive in the context of bluegrass banjo playing. He was inducted into the International Bluegrass Music Hall of Fame at an awards ceremony in Raleigh, North Carolina on October 1, 2015, and delivered a heartfelt address on that occasion, just three weeks prior to his death from cancer at his home in Woodstock, New York on October 23, 2015, aged 75.

Afterwards

Keith made a mechanical contribution to the banjo, as well. He designed a specialized type of banjo tuning peg that facilitates changing quickly from one open tuning to another, while playing. Earlier famed banjoist Earl Scruggs had designed a set of cams which were added to the banjo to perform this task.

Keith's invention made the extra hardware unnecessary, replacing two of the tuning machines already on the banjo —  a more elegant solution. Scruggs himself became a partner in the venture for a while, and the product was known as "Scruggs-Keith Tuners". Known today simply as Keith Tuners, they remain the state of the art, and Bill Keith continued to manufacture and market them personally as the primary product of his own company, the Beacon Banjo Company, until his death. Beacon Banjo tuners continue their proud tradition, now in the hands of his son, Martin.

Discography

Solo and contributions 
1962 Bill Keith & Jim Rooney, Bluegrass Livin' on the Mountain, Prestige Folklore FL 14002
1976 Bill Keith, Something Auld, Something Newgrass, Something Borrowed, Something Bluegrass (1976) Rounder - CD 0084, 1998 (feat. Tony Rice, David Grisman)
1978 Bill Keith and Jim Collier, Hexagone 883020
1981 Tony Trischka, Bill Keith, Bela Fleck, Fiddle Tunes for Banjo, Rounder 0124 CD 1999
1984  Bill Keith, Banjoistics Rounder Select OG US - 148
1993 Bill Keith, Beating Around The Bush, Green Linnet.

With Bill Monroe
1963 Bill Monroe & his Bluegrass Boys, Deca Session, 20 & 27 Mars 1963 reed. CD 3/4, tracks 1 to 7 in : Bluegrass 1963 Bill Monroe & his Bluegrass Boys, July 1963: Two Days at Newport, And More Bears AMD / ACDAA 25001(CD 2003) (feat. Del McCoury, guitar; Bill Keith, banjo; Billy Baker, fiddle; Ralph Rinzler, Bass, producer)
1963 Bill Monroe & his Bluegrass Boys, Live at Mechanic Hall Acoustic Disc, ACD-59 (CD 2004), (recorded 11 November 1963 by David Grisman; feat. Del McCoury, guitar; Bill Keith, banjo; Joe Stuart, fiddle; Bessie Lee Mauldin, Bass)
1991 Bill Monroe, Blue Grass – 1959–1969, Bear Family Records, BCD 15529 (4CD) (feat. Del McCoury, guitar; Bill Keith, banjo; Kenny Baker, fiddle; Bessie Lee Mauldin, bass; Harry Silverstein, producer)

Bands
1964 Red Allen, Frank Wakefield and Kentuckians, The Bluegrass, Folkways Records – FA 2408 CD 2004 Smithsonian Folkways Recordings SFW40127
1965 Jim Kweskin & The Jug Band, Jug Band Music, Vanguard VRS-9163, VSD-79163
1966 Jim Kweskin & The Jug Band, See Reverse Side For Title, Vanguard VRS-9234, VSD-79234
1967 Jim Kweskin & The Jug Band, Garden of Joy, Reprise 6266
1969 Blue Velvet Band, Sweet Moments With The Blue Velvet Band  Warner Bros. - Seven Arts Records WS 1802 (Bill Keith: Pedal Steel Guitar, member of The Blue Velvet Band, with Richard Greene, Jim Rooney, Eric Weissberg).
1972 Mud Acres, Music Among Friends 1972, Rounder 3001
1973 Muleskinner, A Pot pourri of Bluegrass Jam, Warner Bros. records BS 2787 (feat. Peter Rowan, Clarence White, David Grisman)
1973 Muleskinner Live: Original Television Soundtrack, released in 1998, Sierra MSI-11059
1975 Jim Rooney, One day at the Time, Rounder Records, 3008
1975–1976 Bill Keith & Jim Rooney, in Banjo Paris Session vol. 1 Pony/Musigrass; Cezame CEZ 1005 & vol 2 Cezame CEZ 1022
1976 The David Grisman Rounder Record (1976) reed. CD 0069, 1986 (feat. Tony Rice)
1985  Peter Rowan The First Whippoorwill, Sugar Hill, reed. CD 1990 SHCD 3749
1995 Richard Greene, The Grass is Greener, Rebel Records 1995 REB CD 1714

As session musician
 1966 Gloria Belle, Today I Can Smile/Baby, You Gotta Be Mine single 45 RPM Redwing 16171 (sidemen: Bill Keith (banjo) and Clarence "Tater" Tate (fiddle))
 1969 The Bee Gees, Odessa, Polydor Records (UK), Atco Records (US)
 1973 Judy Collins True Stories And Other Dreams Elektra EKS-75053 (sidemen: Bill Keith: Pedal Steel Guitar, with Eric Weissberg)
 1976 Marcel Dadi And Friends – Country Show Guitar World Records – GW 4 (US release)
 1976 Marcel Dadi – Dadi's Pickin' - Lights Up Nashville - Part Two, Cezame – CEZ 1019 (US release, 1977: Nashville Memories, Guitar World Records – GW 6)
 1977 Marcel Dadi – Travelin' Man Guitar World Records – GW 5 (US release)
 1977 Christian Seguret (fr) With Bluegrass Friends: Bill Keith, Mike Lilly, Wendy Miller, Jean Marie Redon (fr), Jean-Claude Druot, Denis Blanchard – Old Fashioned Love, Cezame – CEZ 1035 (tracks: B3, B4)

References

Bibliography
Tony Trischka, Pete Wernick, Masters of the 5-String Banjo, Oak Publications, 1988, 
Neil V. Rosenberg, Charles K. Wolfep The Music of Bill Monroe, University of Illinois Press, 2007, p. 148-151, discography p. 168 sq. Bill Keith is identified as: "Bradford Keith". 
"Bill Keith" in The Encyclopedia of Country Music, The Ultimate Guide to the Music'', ed. by The Country Music Foundation and Paul Kinsbury, Oxford University Press, 1998, p. 276.

External links
Bill Keith's website
Banjo workshop - Grey Fox 2003
Bill "brad" Keith on the ''Bluegrass boys''' pages
Tribute page with audio, video, photos, stories, articles

1939 births
Musicians from Boston
American country banjoists
American bluegrass musicians
2015 deaths
Steel guitarists
American country guitarists
Deaths from cancer in New York (state)
Great Speckled Bird (band) members
20th-century American guitarists
Muleskinner (band) members